The 1978 Cornell Big Red football team was an American football team that represented Cornell University during the 1978 NCAA Division I-A football season. Cornell finished in fourth place in the Ivy League. 

In its second season under head coach Bob Blackman, the team compiled a 5–3–1 record and outscored opponents 188 to 154. Team captains were Mike Donahue and Dave Kintigh. 

Cornell's 3–3–1 conference record placed fourth in the Ivy League standings. The Big Red outscored Ivy opponents 143 to 142. 

Cornell played its home games at Schoellkopf Field in Ithaca, New York.

Schedule

References

Cornell
Cornell Big Red football seasons
Cornell Big Red football